The River Marden is a small tributary of the River Avon in England. It flows from the hills surrounding Calne and meets the Avon about a mile upstream of Chippenham.

Course

The Marden rises just north of the valley of Ranscombe Bottom near Calstone Wellington in Wiltshire. It then flows in a north-west direction through the Blackland area, where it forms a small ornamental lake at Blackland House, and on to Quemerford, where it is joined on the right bank by the Rivers Brook. In Calne, the Abberd Brook joins on the right. The river turns in a westerly direction and is joined by the overspill from Bowood Lake, part of the Bowood House estate, on the left at Studleybrook Farm. The river is then joined by the combined Fisher's and Cowage brooks before turning to the north-west, past the village of Stanley.  later it joins the Bristol Avon to the north-east of Chippenham.

History
The Domesday survey of England in 1086 records four watermills on the Marden at Calne. In the 18th century four fulling mills are recorded and one of these, Upper Mill, became a paper mill in 1768 and continued in operation until 1860. Hassell's Mill at Studley remained in operation until 1960.

A branch of the Wilts & Berks Canal, opened in 1810, paralleled the course of the Marden west of Calne. The canal was closed in 1914 following the collapse into the river of the Stanley aqueduct in 1901. Traces of the canal and its towpath survive.

Hydrology

References

Rivers of Wiltshire
1Marden